Avi is a masculine given name. 

Avi or AVI may also refer to:

 Avi (author), pen name of children's author Edward Irving Wortis
 Zee Avi, Malaysian singer-songwriter, guitarist, and ukulele player born Izyan Alirahman in 1985
 Audio Video Interleave, a multimedia container format and file type associated with the filename extension .avi
 .avi (album), second studio album by Serbian experimental band Consecration
 Avi, Iran, a village in Zanjan Province
 AVI BioPharma, a biopharmaceutical company
 AVI Records, an American independent record label
 Avi Resort & Casino, Nevada, United States
 American Virgin Islands
 Judged by Your Work Party (Asa Vita no Ifampitsarana), a political party in Madagascar
 Automatic Vehicle Identification
 Arkansas Valley Interurban Railway
 Australian Volunteers International
 An abbreviation of Avatar (computing)